Flagship Mountain is a prominent, conical rock peak,  high, surmounting the southern part of the large rock mass between Northwind Glacier and Atka Glacier in the Convoy Range of Victoria Land, Antarctica. It was named by the New Zealand Northern Survey Party of the Commonwealth Trans-Antarctic Expedition (1956–58) after the USS Glacier, flagship of the American convoy into McMurdo Sound in the 1956–57 season, and closely associated with the area in other years.

References 

Mountains of Victoria Land
Scott Coast